S. incana  may refer to:
 Scutellaria incana, the downy skullcap, a flowering plant species native to North America
 Senra incana, a flowering plant species
 Sphaeralcea incana, the grey globemallow, a perennial desert plant species found in Southwestern United States

See also
 Incana (disambiguation)